Polygala smallii is a rare species of flowering plant in the milkwort family known by the common name tiny polygala, or tiny milkwort. It is endemic to Florida in the United States, where it is limited to the southeastern coast of the peninsula. The plant is now only known from eight sites, with most individuals located on one site in Miami-Dade County. The species is threatened by the loss of its habitat. This is a federally listed endangered species of the United States.

Description
The plant is a petite biennial herb growing 2 to 4 centimeters tall from the top of its taproot. The leaves are spatula-shaped and form a rosette at the base of the stems. They are closely packed and measure up to about 3.5 centimeters in length. The top of each stem is occupied by a short inflorescence of yellow-green flowers. The inflorescence often does not exceed the length of the leaf rosette. The plants have an aboveground lifespan of about 180 days, after which they disappear until the next wildfire sweeps the area.

Distribution
This plant grows in Florida scrub and pine rockland habitat in Miami-Dade, Palm Beach, St. Lucie, and Martin Counties in Florida. It occurs on public property occupied by Zoo Miami and adjacent United States Coast Guard property. 10,000 plants have been counted at the latter site, the largest population of the plant. It has been noted at the Fort Lauderdale Executive Airport in a preserve established there for the gopher tortoise. The species has a cyclic life cycle and may exist at sites where it has not been seen recently.

Habitat
The habitat occupied by this plant is maintained by a natural fire regime. Fire helps the plant by removing competing plants. It requires open spaces with sunlight and tolerates disturbance, and it resprouts readily after wildfire has affected the habitat. At times, it has been positively affected by the disturbance created during hurricanes. The long-term practice of fire suppression in the region has allowed the plant's habitat to become overgrown with large and woody vegetation. Habitat conservation must involve periodic prescribed burns or another method of opening the overgrown canopy. Fire is also beneficial because it may trigger germination of the seeds: experiments showed 50% more germination and faster germination in seeds that had been exposed to smoke. Seeds persist in a soil seed bank until they are prompted to germinate.

Another main threat to the species is the outright consumption of its habitat for the construction of residential and commercial real estate.

References

External links

smallii
Endemic flora of Florida